"Elaine" (1945) is an early short story published by J. D. Salinger in Story. In it, the title character lives with her mom and grandmother in the Bronx. She is a beautiful young girl unaware of the miasma of the city around her. One reason for this is that she is intellectually years behind her peers, graduating from eighth grade at 16 after being "tested" at age 7 and forced to stay back two grades. Salinger writes that she is one of only two students wearing lipstick at the graduation ceremony.

Elaine and her mother spend the bulk of their time together watching movies at the local cinema—this seems to be the world both of them escape to. They find a "fourth-rate picture exceptionally engrossing" while watching it with the super of their building. At this point in the story Elaine is introduced to sexuality when the older man touches her leg during the movie. She does not recognize this as an inappropriate gesture and doesn't tell her mom about it.

Later, she meets an usher at the theater, who asks her out on a date. She looks stunning as he picks her up with his friends and they go to the beach. Throughout the story Elaine is unable to pick up on social cues and participate in conversations, suggesting she has a learning disability of some kind. Elaine ends up under the boardwalk where she has sex with her date.

Elaine arranges to marry this boy, Teddy Schmidt, a month later. During the ceremony her mother challenges Teddy, calling him a "sissy" and refuses to let her daughter take part in the wedding. Elaine's mother and grandmother walk across the room and take Elaine back with them as Teddy stands by helpless. Outside the three of them walk towards the theater, to see a Henry Fonda movie.

1945 short stories
Short stories by J. D. Salinger
Works originally published in Story (magazine)